Coole Swan Irish Cream Liqueur is an Irish cream made from a blend of a single-malt Irish whiskey, Belgian white chocolate, and fresh cream. It has a declared alcohol content of 16 percent by volume.
Made in Ireland, Coole Swan is based on the owners' family farm in Co. Meath and bottled in Bailieborogh Co. Cavan.

History 
Coole Swan was launched in Ireland in March 2007. To mark the occasion, British film director Mike Figgis created "Coole Stories" a series of short films, especially for the brand's debut.

Bottle
Based on the Victorian Milk Bottles, the glass bottles are produced by Hrastnik in Slovenia and decorated in Poland by Dekor Glass.

Manufacture 
Callebaut Belgian white chocolate is added to fresh milked cream. The two are then blended in a heating process. Finally, the single malt Irish whiskey is poured into this mix.

Drinking
As is the case with milk, the cream will curdle whenever it comes into contact with a weak acid. Milk and cream contain casein, which coagulates, when mixed with weak acids such as lemon, tonic water, or traces of wine. While this outcome is undesirable in most situations, some cocktails specifically encourage coagulation.

Cocktails and recipes
Coole Swan can be served: 
 Neat or over ice, but always chilled. 
 In coffee or hot chocolate. 
 In cocktails.
 In desserts and smoothies. Irish chef Neven Maguire is a known supporter of Coole Swan, often making his desserts with the liqueur.

Awards
When Coole Swan first launched, it won World's Best Liqueur and a Double Gold at the San Francisco World Spirits Competition. Since then, Coole Swan has won other awards and accolades including: 
 Special Merit Award, Bord Bia, Irish Food & Drink Awards 2007
 5 Star Supreme Rating – BevX.com 
 5 Star Highest Recommendation – Paul Pacult, Spirit Journal 2008
 Great Taste Awards 2008 – Gold & Top Award Winner
 Wine Enthusiast Magazine– 96-100 classic/highest recommendation wine enthusiast, April 2009
 Or Médaille Sélections Mondiales des Spiritueux Canada 2013
 Irish Whiskey Awards – First in Class 2014/2015 
 World Liqueur Awards - Gold 2020 
 Australian International Spirits Competition - Gold 2020

See also

Irish cream
Irish coffee

References 

Cream liqueurs
Irish liqueurs